The Cup of Berlin is an international, multi-level synchronized skating competition that has been held in Berlin, Germany since 2005 (except in 2007, 2009, 2012, 2014, 2016 and 2019) and attracted the world's best teams. It is organized by Deutsche Eislauf-Union and sanctioned by the International Skating Union.

Medalists

Senior teams

References

External links
 Official website of the Cup of Berlin 

Berlin
Berlin
Berlin